Jesse Lumsden (born August 3, 1982) is a Canadian Olympic bobsledder and a retired Canadian football player, who played for the Hamilton Tiger-Cats, Edmonton Eskimos and Calgary Stampeders.

Career

Football
Lumsden is the son of former CFL fullback Neil Lumsden. Jesse attended Trinity College School in Port Hope, Ontario and Nelson High School in Burlington, Ontario (where he led them to the Metro Bowl Title), and McMaster University in Hamilton, Ontario. Lumsden had a standout career at McMaster where he won the Hec Crighton Trophy in 2004 and was invited to the East-West Shrine Game. 

Lumsden was signed as an undrafted free agent by the Seattle Seahawks in 2005, but was released shortly thereafter. Following his release, he had a short tenure with the Hamilton Tiger-Cats. In January 2006, he was signed to play for the Washington Redskins and was later released only to play with the Tiger-Cats once again. In 2009, Lumsden signed with the Edmonton Eskimos, but he sustained a season-ending shoulder injury in their opening game. On May 5, 2010, Lumsden was released by the Eskimos.  He signed with the Calgary Stampeders on a practice roster agreement midway through the 2010 season, and was activated in October.

Lumsden has been timed consistently around 4.4 seconds in the 40-yard dash.

Bobsled
Lumsden took part in the Vancouver 2010 winter Olympics as a member of Pierre Lueders' bobsleigh team; he was the brakeman in the two-man sled that won the Canadian National Bobsleigh championships at the Whistler Sliding Centre, March 21, 2009. It was expected that he participated in both the two-man and four-man teams in the 2009–10 world competitions leading up to the 2010 Winter Olympics. On January 27, 2010 Lumsden was named to the 2010 Canadian Olympic bobsleigh team where he and driver Pierre Lueders finished fifth both in the two-man and in the four-man bobsleigh events. During the Olympics, he and his four-man bobsled team flipped over during a false turn. Justin Kripps and the others walked out of the accident untouched.

Lumsden became partners with Lyndon Rush at the beginning of the 2012 season and the duo won their first World Cup Gold medal together in the two-man event on February 3, 2012. It was the first gold medal of Lumsden's career and his second medal overall. On February 19, 2012 the pair won a silver medal at the world bobsleigh championships in Lake Placid, N.Y. In 2013 Lumsden allowed Rush to win the overall World Cup two-man bobsleigh title.

Lumsden qualified for the 2014 Sochi Winter Olympics as a member of the Canada 1 four-man bobsled team, and a member of the Canada 2, two-man bobsled. Lumsden finished 7th overall in the 2-man Bobsled competition, finishing 1.4 seconds behind the leader through 4 heats.

References

External links

JesseLumsden28.com Official website
Canadian Football League bio

1982 births
Bobsledders at the 2010 Winter Olympics
Bobsledders at the 2014 Winter Olympics
Bobsledders at the 2018 Winter Olympics
Canadian male bobsledders
Canadian football running backs
Canadian people of Scottish descent
Hamilton Tiger-Cats players
Living people
McMaster Marauders football players
Nelson High School (Ontario) alumni
Olympic bobsledders of Canada
Players of Canadian football from Alberta
Players of Canadian football from Ontario
Sportspeople from Edmonton
Canadian football people from Edmonton
Canadian players of American football